Sixteen is a former unincorporated community in southwestern Meagher County, Montana, United States. The town was a station stop on the transcontinental main line of the Chicago, Milwaukee, St. Paul and Pacific Railroad ("the Milwaukee Road"), and was a community center for a small number of area ranchers and  homesteaders. The rail line through Sixteen was originally constructed in 1895 by the Montana Railroad, and the town served as a base camp for railway construction crews.

The town took its name from Sixteen Mile Creek, which runs through the narrow valley containing the village. Sixteen Mile Canyon, immediately west of the town, was considered a scenic highlight of the Milwaukee Road line. Eagle Nest Tunnel, one of the railroad's better-known engineering features, remains intact and is located about four miles west of Sixteen.

The Sixteen post office was first opened in 1890, and closed in 1944.

The population of Sixteen was never large, and by the late 20th century the town was nearly deserted. The railroad through the area was abandoned in 1980, and Sixteen is now a ghost town.

Sixteen is home to an annual private event, The Rattlesnake Round-up.

Further reading

Geography of Meagher County, Montana
Ghost towns in Montana